Game, Net & Match! is a video game developed by German studio Media Games and published by Blue Byte for Windows in 1998.

Reception

The game received above-average reviews according to the review aggregation website GameRankings. Next Generation said that the game "does a decent job of filling in for the lack of tennis games on the market."

References

External links
 

1998 video games
Blue Byte games
Tennis video games
Video games developed in Germany
Windows games
Windows-only games